The women's 200 metres at the 1974 European Athletics Championships was held in Rome, Italy, at Stadio Olimpico on 4 and 6 September 1974.

Medalists

Results

Final
6 September
Wind: -2.8 m/s

Semi-finals
6 September

Semi-final 1
Wind: -0.2 m/s

Semi-final 2
Wind: 0 m/s

Heats
4 September

Heat 1
Wind: 1 m/s

Heat 2
Wind: -1.2 m/s

Heat 3
Wind: 0 m/s

Heat 4
Wind: -1.5 m/s

Participation
According to an unofficial count, 20 athletes from 11 countries participated in the event.

 (1)
 (3)
 (1)
 (2)
 (1)
 (1)
 (1)
 (2)
 (2)
 (3)
 (3)

References

200 metres
200 metres at the European Athletics Championships
1974 in women's athletics